Araga Jnanendra is an Indian politician currently serving as the Minister of Home Department Excluding Intelligence Wing of Karnataka from 04 August 2021. He is the Member of the Karnataka Legislative assembly from Thirthahalli constituency.

Early life and education
Araga Jnanendra Kumar was born in 1953 in Hisana, Araga village at Thirthahalli taluk. He received his primary education in village before continuing his education at a high school M S memorial public school Motihari. He completed his B.Com. in State college of Shimoga.

Political career

He is a member of Rashtriya Swayamsevak Sangh, and began his career in electoral politics in 1983.

In 1983 and 1985 he contested and lost Member of Legislative assembly (MLA) elections.

In 1986 he won Jilla Parishatha election and worked as President of Krushi Sthayi Samithi.
In 1989 he lost the MLA elections for the third time.
He finally won the Member of Legislative assembly (MLA) election for the first time in 1994.

Beginning in 1991 he worked in Shimoga Co-operative Milk Dairy.

He was reelected in the MLA election in 1999 and 2004 but in 2009 he lost the MLA election.

In 2009 he was selected Chairman of Mysore Paper Mills, Badravathi.

In 2013 he lost the MLA election.

In 2018 he won the Assembly election by a margin of 22000 votes.

In 2021 he was sworn in as cabinet minister in Govt. of Karnataka.

References

Living people
1953 births
Bharatiya Janata Party politicians from Karnataka
Indian Hindus
People from Shimoga district
Karnataka MLAs 2018–2023
Karnataka MLAs 1994–1999
Karnataka MLAs 1999–2004
Karnataka MLAs 2004–2007